Tiverton is a small village located on the northeast tip of Long Island, Nova Scotia. Tiverton has a population of about 300 people. It was named for Tiverton, Devon.

The main industry is lobster fishing, while a second, and growing industry, is tourism. The Bay of Fundy is known for whale watching, and Tiverton and the surrounding area offer several tours operating throughout the summer months. Another attraction is Balancing Rock, a large basalt column that appears to be balancing on its end on the southern shore just outside Tiverton.

References

Photo Fisheries and Oceans Canada

External links
 Islands Community Access Program

Villages in Nova Scotia